Television and Entertainment Licensing Authority or (TELA) was an entertainment regulatory agency in Hong Kong under the Government of Hong Kong.

On 1 April 2012, TELA merged with Hong Kong Broadcasting Authority and Office of the Telecommunications Authority to create a new authority, the Communications Authority.

Previous Commissioners

 Cheung Po Duk 張寶德 (1995—1996)
 Chan Juk-duk 陳育德 (1996—2002)
 Wong Long-si 黃浪詩 (2003—2007)
 Maisie Cheng 鄭美施 (2007—2010)
 Lau Ming-gwong 劉明光 (2010-2012)

See also 
 Hong Kong Broadcasting Authority
 Office of the Telecommunications Authority

References

External links
www.tela.gov.hk

Statutory bodies in Hong Kong
Hong Kong government departments and agencies
Entertainment rating organizations